The 2019 WAFF U-18 Girls Championship was the 2nd edition of the WAFF U-18 Girls Championship, the international women's football youth championship of Western Asia organised by the West Asian Football Federation (WAFF). It was held in Bahrain from 29 December 2019 to 6 January 2020. Lebanon won their first title, after beating hosts Bahrain 3–0 in the final.

Teams
Seven teams competed in the tournament.

Group stage
All times are local, AST (UTC+3).

Group A

Group B

5th place play-off

Knockout stage
All times are local, AST (UTC+3).

Bracket

Semi-finals

Third place play-off

Final

Statistics

Final ranking
As per statistical convention in football, matches decided in extra time are counted as wins and losses, while matches decided by penalty shoot-outs are counted as draws.

Goalscorers

References

External links
 2019 WAFF U-18 Girls Championship at Goalzz.com

U18 2018
WAFF U18
WAFF U18
WAFF U18
WAFF U18